Jacob Hirsch Soboroff (born March 27, 1983) is an American journalist. He is known as a correspondent for NBC News and MSNBC. Prior to his debut on the network in September 2015, he was the host of YouTube Nation and a co-host of TakePart Live on Pivot TV. He was also a founding host and producer of HuffPost Live, the live streaming network of HuffPost.

Early life
Born in Los Angeles, California, Soboroff is the eldest child of Patti (née Schertzer) and Steve Soboroff, a member of the Los Angeles Board of Police Commissioners. He is of Jewish descent. Soboroff attended Harvard-Westlake School, and later received a Bachelor of Arts in politics in 2005 and a Master of Arts in political theory and philosophy in 2006, both from New York University.

Career
In college, Soboroff was an aide to New York City Mayor Michael R. Bloomberg.

Soboroff was a contributor to MTV's 2012 presidential election coverage, for which he discussed America's young voters with presidential candidate Mitt Romney. As the founding correspondent for AMC News, Soboroff interviewed actors and filmmakers. Soboroff co-hosted NBC's proactive school makeover show School Pride. He has contributed reporting to CNN, NPR's Weekend Edition, and the PBS series Wired Science. Between January and December 2014, Soboroff hosted YouTube Nation, a pop-culture oriented news show on YouTube.

As a correspondent for MSNBC, Soboroff specializes in border issues, making him one of the first reporters to call public attention to the Trump administration family separation policy, whereby children were separated from parents who crossed the U.S.-Mexico border without proper documentation. He was one of ten journalists invited by authorities to tour Casa Padre, a facility in Texas housing 1500 boys ages 10 to 17. He described it as "shocking... an old Walmart which has essentially been turned into a child prison." His book on the subject, titled Separated: Inside an American Tragedy, was published on July 7, 2020.

Personal life
Soboroff resides in Los Angeles. He married fashion executive Nicole Cari in 2012. He has two children. Soboroff is an executive director of the nonpartisan organization Why Tuesday? It seeks to make "America's democracy stronger through increased voter participation".

References

External links

American television journalists
MSNBC people
NBC News people
HuffPost writers and columnists
Journalists from California
Jewish American journalists
Writers from Los Angeles
New York University alumni